The 1980 NBA draft was the 34th annual draft of the National Basketball Association (NBA). The draft was held on June 10, 1980, at the Sheraton Centre Hotel & Towers, before the 1980–81 season. In this draft, 23 NBA teams took turns selecting amateur U.S. college basketball players and other eligible players, including international players. The first two picks in the draft belonged to the teams that finished last in each conference, with the order determined by a coin flip. The Boston Celtics, who obtained the Detroit Pistons' first-round pick in a trade, won the coin flip and were awarded the first overall pick, while the Utah Jazz were awarded the second pick. The Celtics then traded the first pick to the Golden State Warriors before the draft. The remaining first-round picks and the subsequent rounds were assigned to teams in reverse order of their win–loss record in the previous season. An expansion franchise, the Dallas Mavericks, took part in the NBA Draft for the first time and were assigned the eleventh pick in each round. A player who had finished his four-year college eligibility was automatically eligible for selection. Before the draft, five college underclassmen announced that they would leave college early and would be eligible for selection. The draft consisted of 10 rounds comprising the selection of 214 players. This draft has the distinction of being the first NBA Draft to be televised.

Draft selections and draftee career notes
Joe Barry Carroll from Purdue University was selected first overall by the Golden State Warriors. Darrell Griffith from the University of Louisville was selected second by the Utah Jazz. He went on to win the Rookie of the Year Award in his first season. Kevin McHale from the University of Minnesota was selected third by the Boston Celtics. McHale spent his entire 13-year career with the Celtics and won three NBA championships. He also won two consecutive Sixth Man of the Year Award and was also selected to one All-NBA Team, seven All Star Games and six All-Defensive Teams. For his achievements, he has been inducted to the Basketball Hall of Fame. McHale was also named to the list of the 50 Greatest Players in NBA History announced at the league's 50th anniversary in 1996. Carroll, 8th pick Andrew Toney, 11th pick Kiki Vandeweghe and 25th pick Jeff Ruland are the only other players from this draft who was selected to an All-Star Game.

Nine players drafted went on to have a coaching career in the NBA. Mike Woodson, the 12th pick, coached the Atlanta Hawks for six seasons. Butch Carter, the 37th pick, coached the Toronto Raptors for two and a half seasons. Terry Stotts, the 38th pick, coached both the Atlanta Hawks and Milwaukee Bucks for two seasons, and the Portland Trail Blazers for nine seasons. Two other players, Kiki Vandeweghe and Kenny Natt, had brief spells as interim head coaches in the NBA, each of which lasted less than one season. Woodson would later go on to be the first person in NBA history to become head coach of the team that drafted him when he took over as head coach of the New York Knicks on an interim basis in March 2012.

Key

Draft

Other picks
The following list includes other draft picks who have appeared in at least one NBA game.

Notable other draftees
These players were not selected in either the first or second round in the 1980 draft, nor did they play at least one game in the NBA, but are notable.

Notable undrafted players
These players were not selected in the 1980 draft but played at least one game in the NBA.

Trades

Draft-day trades
The following trades involving drafted players were made on the day of the draft.
 The Portland Trail Blazers acquired the draft rights to fourth pick Kelvin Ransey and a 1981 first-round pick from the Chicago Bulls in exchange for the draft rights to tenth pick Ronnie Lester and a 1981 first-round pick.
 The Washington Bullets acquired the draft rights to 25th pick Jeff Ruland from the Golden State Warriors in exchange for a 1981 second-round pick.

Pre-draft trades
Prior to the day of the draft, the following trades were made and resulted in exchanges of picks between the teams.
 On June 9, 1980, the Golden State Warriors acquired the first and the thirteenth pick from the Boston Celtics in exchange for Robert Parish and the third pick. Previously, the Celtics acquired two first-round picks on September 6, 1979, from the Detroit Pistons in exchange for Bob McAdoo. This trade was arranged as compensation when the Celtics signed M. L. Carr on July 24, 1979. Previously, the Pistons acquired 1980 and 1982 first-round picks on July 12, 1979, from the Washington Bullets as compensation for the signing of Kevin Porter as a free agent. The Warriors used the picks to draft Joe Barry Carroll and Rickey Brown. The Celtics used the pick to draft Kevin McHale.
 On February 8, 1980, the New Jersey Nets acquired Maurice Lucas, 1980 and 1981 first-round picks from the Portland Trail Blazers in exchange for Calvin Natt. Previously, the Blazers acquired Kermit Washington, Kevin Kunnert and the pick on May 13, 1979, from the San Diego Clippers as compensation for the signing of Bill Walton as a free agent. The Nets used the pick to draft Mike Gminski.
 On November 2, 1976, the Philadelphia 76ers acquired a first-round pick from the Indiana Pacers in exchange for Mel Bennett. The 76ers used the pick to draft Andrew Toney.
 On September 21, 1979, the San Diego Clippers acquired a first-round pick from the Cleveland Cavaliers in exchange for Randy Smith. The Clippers used the pick to draft Michael Brooks.
 On July 16, 1979, the Washington Bullets acquired a first-round pick from the Houston Rockets as compensation for the signing of Tom Henderson as a free agent. The Bullets used the pick to draft Wes Matthews.
 On February 4, 1980, the Detroit Pistons acquired Kent Benson and a first-round pick from the Milwaukee Bucks in exchange for Bob Lanier. The Pistons used the pick to draft Larry Drew.
 On January 12, 1979, the Utah Jazz acquired Marty Byrnes, Ron Lee, 1979 and 1980 first-round picks from the Phoenix Suns in exchange for Truck Robinson. The Jazz used the pick to draft John Duren.
 On February 15, 1980, the Cleveland Cavaliers acquired Don Ford and a 1980 first-round pick from the Los Angeles Lakers in exchange for Butch Lee and a 1982 first-round pick. The Cavaliers used the pick to draft Chad Kinch.
 On February 1, 1980, the Denver Nuggets acquired Alex English and a first-round pick from the Indiana Pacers in exchange for George McGinnis. Previously, the Pacers acquired the pick on July 19, 1978, from the Boston Celtics in exchange for Earl Tatum. The Nuggets used the pick to draft Carl Nicks.
 On October 9, 1978, the Golden State Warriors acquired a second-round pick from the Detroit Pistons in exchange for Rickey Green. The Warriors used the pick to draft Larry Smith.
 On October 9, 1978, the Chicago Bulls acquired Oliver Mack, 1980 and 1981 second-round picks from the Los Angeles Lakers in exchange for Mark Landsberger. Previously, the Lakers acquired 1977, 1978 and 1979 first-round picks, and a 1980 second-round pick on August 5, 1976, from the Utah Jazz in exchange for a 1978 first-round pick and a 1977 second-round pick. This trade was arranged as compensation when the Jazz signed Gail Goodrich on July 19, 1976. The Bulls used the pick to draft Sam Worthen.

Early entrants

College underclassmen
The following college basketball players successfully applied for early draft entrance.

  Joe Cammarano – F, Los Angeles Mission (junior)
  Wes Matthews – G, Wisconsin (junior)
  Randy Owens – F, Philadelphia Textile (sophomore)
  William Phillips – F, Tennessee–Chattanooga (junior)
  Jeff Ruland – C, Iona (junior)
  DeWayne Scales – F, LSU (junior)
  Ron Webb – F, Oklahoma (junior)

See also
 List of first overall NBA draft picks

References
General

Specific

External links
NBA.com
NBA.com: NBA Draft History

Draft
National Basketball Association draft
NBA draft
NBA draft
1980s in Manhattan
Basketball in New York City
Sporting events in New York City
Sports in Manhattan